Kukljica is a village on the island of Ugljan in Croatia. According to the 2011 census, there are 714 inhabitants, 98% which are Croats.

Attractions

Kukljica is a tourist and fishing town on the southeastern side of the island of Ugljan close to the Zdrelac Strait, also known as the “doorway to Telašćica Nature Park and Kornati National Park”. It has 52 km2 and 75 km of coastline abounding with bays. Ugljan faces Zadar from which it is separated by the Zadar Channel which is only 3 NM wide. It is well-connected with the mainland by ferryboats. A bridge at the crossing Ždrelac connects Ugljan with the island of Pašman. The old part of Kukljica consists of Mediterranean architecture with orange tile roofs and is separated from the green peninsula on which the settlement is situated by a large natural inlet and port. The sandy beaches of Sabuša, Kostanj, Zelena Punta, and Jelenica stretch to both sides of the island in the shade of centennial pinewood. In the haven Kostanj there is a valuable historical monument, the restored old Christian church of St. Jerome from the 13th century. 

Every year a traditional procession to the shrine of Our Lady of Snow, which has been taking place here since 1514, is held on 5 August, in memory of the day when, according to legend, it snowed five centuries earlier. The statue is accompanied by a procession of hundreds of boats of all sizes encircling the boat that carries the "Lady of Snow" statue. Festival activities include tug-of-war, donkey races, climbing a greased pole to get to a prosciutto that is hung at the top. Along with a concert, there are many vendors selling goods, especially food carts selling traditional palačinke.

Kukljica is home to the Bačić, Bačoka, Benić, Bilan, Blagdan, Martinović, Meštrić, Milić, and Vulin families.

External links
 Kukljica Tourist Office

Municipalities of Croatia
Populated places in Zadar County
Ugljan